Léon Deladerrière (26 July 1927 – 13 March 2013) was a French footballer and coach.

He played for FC Nancy and Toulouse FC.

After his playing career, he became a coach with Toulouse FC, FC Nancy, LB Châteauroux, FC Mulhouse and US Boulogne.

References

External links
 

1927 births
2013 deaths
French footballers
France international footballers
Ligue 1 players
FC Nancy players
French football managers
LB Châteauroux managers
FC Mulhouse managers
US Boulogne managers
Association football forwards
Sportspeople from Nord (French department)
Footballers from Hauts-de-France